Dublin City was a constituency represented in the Irish House of Commons to 1801.

History
In the Patriot Parliament of 1689 summoned by James II, Dublin City was represented by two members. In the 1760s the radical politician Charles Lucas used the seat as his political base.

Members of Parliament, 1264–1801
1557 James Stanihurst (speaker)
1560 James Stanihurst (speaker) and Robert Golding
1569 James Stanihurst (speaker)
1585 George Taylor and Nicholas Ball
1613-1615 Richard Bolton and Richard Barry
1634-1635 Richard Barry and Nathaniel Catelyn Speaker
1639–1649 Richard Barry and John Bysse
1654–55: Daniel Hutchinson
1656–58: Richard Tighe
1659: Arthur Annesley
1661–1666 William Smith and Sir William Davys

1689–1801

Elections

Notes

References

Bibliography

Constituencies of the Parliament of Ireland (pre-1801)
Historic constituencies in County Dublin
1264 establishments in Ireland
1800 disestablishments in Ireland
Constituencies established in 1264
Constituencies disestablished in 1800